Iffley Halt railway station was built by the Great Western Railway to serve Iffley, a suburb of Oxford; it was actually in Kennington, and not in Iffley.

The station was situated at the western end of Kennington Railway Bridge, which crosses the River Thames. Access from Iffley was via the River Thames towpath, which has a footbridge over Hinksey Stream close to this point.
It was opened on 1 February 1908 along with four other halts on the former Wycombe Railway route between Oxford and Wheatley.

When the railmotor services were withdrawn on 22 March 1915, the halt closed. The line remained open for through passenger services, but these did not call at Iffley Halt.

Route

References

Disused railway stations in Oxfordshire
Former Great Western Railway stations
Railway stations in Great Britain opened in 1908
Railway stations in Great Britain closed in 1915
1908 establishments in England